Gökçen is a Turkish given name which means "beautiful woman", "blue-eyed woman", or "belonging to the sky", and may refer to:

Given names
 Gökçen Denkel (born 1985), Turkish female volleyball player
 Gökçen Efe (1881–1919), Turkish folk hero

Surname
 Kemalettin Sami Gökçen (1884–1934), officer of the Ottoman Army and general of the Turkish Army
 Sabiha Gökçen (1913–2001), Turkish female aviator

Place
 Gökçen, İzmir, a town in İzmir Province
 Gökçen, Kocaköy

See also
 Sabiha Gökçen International Airport, an airport in Istanbul

Turkish-language surnames
Turkish feminine given names
Turkish masculine given names